Leave No Ashes is an album by the American hard rock band Burning Brides.  It was released on June 29, 2004, on V2.

Track listing

Personnel 

 Dimitri Coats - electric guitar, vocals
 Melanie Coats - bass
 Jason Kourkounis - drums

References

2004 albums
Burning Brides albums
Albums produced by George Drakoulias
Albums produced by Dimitri Coats
V2 Records albums